Dipendu Dowary is an Indian professional footballer who currently plays as a midfielder for BSS Sporting Club in the Calcutta Football League.

References

External links
 
 

Living people
Indian footballers
I-League players
Mohun Bagan AC players
Bhawanipore FC players
Tollygunge Agragami FC players
Bharat FC players
Mohammedan SC (Kolkata) players
Association football midfielders
Year of birth missing (living people)
Calcutta Football League players